This page covers all relevant details regarding PFC Cherno More Varna for all official competitions inside the 2012–13 season. These are A PFG and Bulgarian Cup.

Transfers

In

Out

Loans in

Loans out

Squad information

Competitions

Pre-season and Friendlies

A PFG

League table

Results summary

League performance

Bulgarian Cup

Squad statistics 

|-
|align="left"|||align="left"|||align="left"|  †
|0||0||0||0||0||0||0||0||
|-
|align="left"|||align="left"|||align="left"| 
|||0||0||0||style="background:#98FB98"|||0||0||0||
|-
|align="left"|||align="left"|||align="left"|  
|25||2||4||1||29||3||8||0||
|-
|align="left"|||align="left"|||align="left"|  
|13||0||3||0||15||0||4||0||
|-
|align="left"|||align="left"|||align="left"|  
|||0||1||0||||0||6||0||
|-
|align="left"|||align="left"|||align="left"|  
|||5||4||0||style="background:#98FB98"|||5||4||0||
|-
|align="left"|||align="left"|||align="left"|  
|0||0||||0||||0||0||0||
|-
|align="left"|||align="left"|||align="left"|  †
|0||0||0||0||0||0||0||0||
|-
|align="left"|||align="left"|FW||align="left"|  
|||2||||0||||2||2||1||
|-
|align="left"|10||align="left"|FW||align="left"|  
|||1||4||0||||1||4||1||
|-
|align="left"|11||align="left"|||align="left"|  †
|||2||3||0||||2||0||0||
|-
|align="left"|11||align="left"|||align="left"| 
|||2||0||0||style="background:#98FB98"|||2||0||0||
|-
|align="left"|12||align="left"|||align="left"|  †
|||0||||0||style="background:#98FB98"|||0||3||0||
|-
|align="left"|13||align="left"|||align="left"| 
|||0||0||0||||0||1||0||
|-
|align="left"|14||align="left"|FW||align="left"|  
|||5||||0||||5||3||0||
|-
|align="left"|15||align="left"|||align="left"|  
|30||0||2||0||32||0||2||0||
|-
|align="left"|18||align="left"|||align="left"|  †
|||0||1||0||||0||1||0||
|-
|align="left"|18||align="left"|||align="left"| 
|||0||0||0||style="background:#98FB98"|||0||4||0||
|-
|align="left"|19||align="left"|||align="left"|  † 
|||0||||0||||0||3||0||
|-
|align="left"|19||align="left"|FW||align="left"| 
|||4||0||0||style="background:#98FB98"|||4||0||0||
|-
|align="left"|20||align="left"|||align="left"|  †
|||0||1||0||style="background:#98FB98"|||0||0||0||
|-
|align="left"|21||align="left"|||align="left"|  (c)
|29||7||2||0||31||7||3||0||
|-
|align="left"|22||align="left"|||align="left"|  †
|||0||||0||||0||0||0||
|-
|align="left"|23||align="left"|||align="left"|  
|||0||4||0||||0||2||0||
|-
|align="left"|24||align="left"|||align="left"| 
|||0||0||0||||0||1||0||
|-
|align="left"|25||align="left"|||align="left"|  
|26||0||1||0||27||0||7||1||
|-
|align="left"|26||align="left"|||align="left"|  
|0||0||0||0||0||0||0||0||
|-
|align="left"|30||align="left"|FW||align="left"|  
|||1||3||1||||2||4||0||
|-
|align="left"|33||align="left"|||align="left"|  
|28||0||1||0||29||0||5||0||
|-
|align="left"|37||align="left"|||align="left"|  †
|0||0||0||0||0||0||0||0||
|-
|align="left"|37||align="left"|||align="left"| 
|0||0||0||0||0||0||0||0||
|-
|align="left"|77||align="left"|||align="left"|  ¤ †
|0||0||0||0||0||0||0||0||
|-
|align="left"|83||align="left"|||align="left"| 
|||1||0||0||style="background:#98FB98"|||1||2||0||
|-
|align="left"|86||align="left"|||style="background:#faecc8; text-align:left;"|  ‡
|||0||0||0||||0||0||0||
|-
|align="left"|91||align="left"|||align="left"|  
|||0||3||0||||0||0||0||
|-
|align="left"|99||align="left"|FW||align="left"|  
|||0||||1||||1||0||0||
|-
|}

Start formations
Accounts for all competitions. Numbers constitute according game of the competition in which the formation was used, NOT number of occurrences.

Club
Coaching staff
{|class="wikitable"
!Position
!Staff
|-
|-
|Manager|| Stefan Genov (until 24 September),  Adalbert Zafirov (26 September-17 December), then  Georgi Ivanov
|-
|Assistant First Team Coach|| Ivaylo Petrov (from 17 December)
|-
|Assistant First Team Coach|| Emanuil Lukanov
|-
|Goalkeeper Coach|| Stoyan Stavrev
|-
|First Team Fitness Coach|| Veselin Markov
|-
|Individual Team Fitness Coach|| Viktor Bumbalov
|-
|Medical Director|| Dr. Petko Atev
|-
|Academy Manager|| Hristina Dimitrova
|-Other information

References

PFC Cherno More Varna seasons
Cherno More Varna